Epinotia nigrovenata is a species of moth of the family Tortricidae. It is found in Chile (Maule, Valparaíso and O'Higgins regions).

The wingspan is 15 mm for males and 16–19 mm for females. The ground colour of the forewings of the males is greyish, scaled with blackish grey, preserved in the dorsal half of the wing. The costal half of the wing is brownish grey, suffused with blackish grey. The hindwings are whitish, but the veins and periphery are brownish. Females have cream forewings with brownish suffusions and dots. The hindwings are brownish cream and brownish on the periphery.

Etymology
The species name refers to the black veins of the hindwings and is derived from Latin niger (meaning black) and venatus (meaning with veins).

References

Moths described in 2010
Eucosmini
Moths of South America
Taxa named by Józef Razowski
Endemic fauna of Chile